Bonnie Somerville (born February 24, 1974) is an American actress and singer. She has had roles in a number of movies and television series, most notably as Mona in Friends, NYPD Blue, Grosse Pointe, The O.C., Cashmere Mafia, Without a Paddle, and Golden Boy. She starred as Dr. Christa Lorenson in season one of the CBS medical drama Code Black.

Early life 

Somerville was born and grew up in the Brooklyn borough of New York City. She started acting and singing at a young age, appearing in high school plays at Poly Prep Country Day School in Bay Ridge in Brooklyn. Somerville studied Musical Theater at Boston College. At the age of 22 she moved to Los Angeles, assembled a band and got an agent.

Career 
Somerville's first acting job was as an extra in the 1996 film City Hall. She had a lead role as Lyne Danner in the CBS miniseries Shake, Rattle and Roll: An American Love Story (1999), in which she also sang. In 2000, Somerville starred in the series Grosse Pointe which aired on The WB from September 2000 to February 2001. The series followed the set of a fictitious WB nighttime soap, also called Grosse Pointe, and several characters were based on real-life actors. Somerville played Ross Geller's girlfriend, Mona, for seven episodes in the eighth season of the NBC sitcom Friends. She had small roles in films Bedazzled (2000), Spider-Man 2 (2004) and Without a Paddle (2004).

In 2003, Somerville landed a recurring role as Rachel Hoffman, a former colleague of Sandy Cohen, in the first season of Fox's teen drama series The O.C.. She appeared on the cover of Stuff magazine's May 2004 issue titled, "Girls of The O.C." and later on the cover of the magazine's November 2005 issue. In 2005, Somerville starred in the short-lived sitcom Kitchen Confidential opposite Bradley Cooper. During the final season of NYPD Blue, she had a supporting role as Det. Laura Murphy, appearing in fifteen episodes. Her song "Winding Road" was included on the Garden State soundtrack, a film written and directed by Zach Braff. She sang backup vocals on Joshua Radin's first album, We Were Here (2006). Somerville was a singer in the charity cover band Band from TV with Greg Grunberg, Bob Guiney, James Denton, Hugh Laurie among others. 

In 2008, portrayed Caitlin Dowd in ABC's comedy-drama series Cashmere Mafia, her third Darren Star-produced television show. Cashmere Mafia followed the lives of four ambitious women as they try to balance their glamorous and demanding careers with their complex personal lives in New York City. ABC decided not to renew the series for a second season. She portrayed Suzie Cavandish in the ABC Family romantic comedy film Labor Pains (2009) starring Lindsay Lohan. She also appeared in films Shades of Ray(2008), The Ugly Truth (2009), The Search for Santa Paws (2010), Seven Below (2012), Fire with Fire (2012) and Treasure Buddies (2012). Somerville portrayed Sam in the comedy film The Best and the Brightest (2010) opposite Neil Patrick Harris.

She had guest roles on several television shows, including Gary Unmarried, Royal Pains, The Mentalist and Motive. In 2011, Somerville starred in the Hallmark Channel Christmas television film A Holiday Engagement, in which she sings the song "Angels We Have Heard On High". In 2013, Somerville played Detective Mackenzie on CBS's crime drama series Golden Boy which aired for one season. She played Dr. Christa Lorenson, a mature first-year resident, in the first season of the medical drama series Code Black. She filmed a cameo for the musical drama film A Star Is Born (2018) but her scenes were deleted.

Filmography

Film

Television

Discography

 Songs from Another Life EP (2009)

References

External links 

 

1974 births
20th-century American actresses
21st-century American actresses
Actresses from New York City
American film actresses
American television actresses
Boston College alumni
Lee Strasberg Theatre and Film Institute alumni
Living people
Musicians from Brooklyn
Singers from New York City
21st-century American singers
21st-century American women singers
Poly Prep alumni